The 1946 Kansas Collegiate Athletic Conference football season was the season of college football played by the seven member schools of the Kansas Collegiate Athletic Conference (KCAC) as part of the 1946 college football season. 

The Bethany Swedes compiled a 6–2 record and won the KCAC championship. 

The Ottawa Braves finished in second place and led the conference in both scoring offense (25.9 points per game) and scoring defense (3.7 points per game).

None of the KCAC teams was ranked in the Associated Press poll or played in a bowl game.

Conference overview

Teams

Bethany

The 1946 Bethany Swedes football team was an American football team that represented Bethany College as a member of the Kansas Collegiate Athletic Conference (KCAC) during the 1946 college football season. In their sixth, non-consecutive season under head coach Ray D. Hahn, the team compiled a 6–2 record (5–1 against KCAC opponents) and won the KCAC championship.

The team played its home games at Bethany Field in Lindsborg, Kansas.

Ottawa

The 1946 Ottawa Braves football team was an American football team that represented Ottawa University in Ottawa, Kansas, as a member of the Kansas Collegiate Athletic Conference (KCAC) during the 1946 college football season. Led by head coach Wally A. Forsberg, the team compiled a 7–1–1 record (4–1–1 against KCAC opponents), tied for second place in the KCAC, shut out seven of nine opponents, and outscored all opponents by a total of 233 to 33.

Baker

The 1946 Baker Wildcats football team was an American football team that represented Baker University in Baldwin City, Kansas, as a member of the Kansas Collegiate Athletic Conference (KCAC) during the 1946 college football season. Led by head coach Karl Spear, the team compiled a 5–3–1 record (4–1–1 against KCAC opponents), tied for second place in the KCAC, and outscored opponents by a total of 154 to 71.

McPherson

The 1946 McPherson Bulldogs football team was an American football team that represented McPherson College in McPherson, Kansas, as a member of the Kansas Collegiate Athletic Conference (KCAC) during the 1946 college football season. Led by head coach Thomas C. Hayden, the team compiled a 4–3–1 record (3–2–1 against KCAC opponents), finished in fourth place in the KCAC, and was outscored by a total of 114 to 107.

Kansas Wesleyan

The 1946 Kansas Wesleyan Coyotes football team was an American football team that represented Kansas Wesleyan University in Salina, Kansas, as a member of the Kansas Collegiate Athletic Conference (KCAC) during the 1946 college football season. Led by head coach Virgil Baer, the team compiled a 3–4–2 record (2–3–1 against KCAC opponents), finished in fifth place in the KCAC, and was outscored by a total of 72 to 54.

Bethel

The 1946 Bethel Graymaroons football team was an American football team that represented Bethel College in North Newton, Kansas, as a member of the Kansas Collegiate Athletic Conference (KCAC) during the 1946 college football season. Led by head coach Bob Tully, the team compiled a 2–6 record (1–5 against KCAC opponents), finished in sixth place in the KCAC, and was outscored by a total of 113 to 51.

College of Emporia

The 1946 College of Emporia Fighting Presbies football team was an American football team that represented the College of Emporia in Emporia, Kansas, as a member of the Kansas Collegiate Athletic Conference (KCAC) during the 1946 college football season. Led by head coach Walt Newland, the team compiled a 1–8 record (0–6 against KCAC opponents), finished in last place in the KCAC, and was outscored by a total of 195 to 38.

All-conference team
At the end of the season, the Associated Press (AP) selected a 1946 Kansas Conference all-star team. Ottawa, which finished second in the conference standings, placed four players on the first team. Conference champion Bethany placed three on the first team.  The first-team picks by position were:
 Backs: Bill Olson, Bethany; Roy Carlson, Bethany; John Wassmer, Ottawa; Howard Knight, Baker
 Ends: Jim Irick, Baker; James Cahoon, Bethany
 Tackles: Warren Smith, Kansas Wesleyan; Buck Reinicker, McPherson
 Guards: Harry Trigg, Ottawa; Tom Trigg, Ottawa
 Center: Bill Erickson, Ottawa

References